Dinosaur reproduction was relevant to archosaur physiology, with newborns hatching from eggs. Dinosaurs did not nurture their offspring as mammals typically do, and because dinosaurs did not nurse, it is likely that most dinosaurs were capable of surviving on their own after hatching.

Medullary bone
A discovery of features in a Tyrannosaurus rex skeleton provided more evidence that dinosaurs and birds evolved from a common ancestor and, for the first time, allowed paleontologists to establish the sex of a dinosaur. When laying eggs, female birds grow a special type of bone between the hard outer bone and the marrow of their limbs. This medullary bone, which is rich in calcium, is used to make eggshells. The presence of endosteally derived bone tissues lining the interior marrow cavities of portions of the Tyrannosaurus rex specimen's hind limb suggested that T. rex used similar reproductive strategies, and revealed the specimen to be female. Further research has found medullary bone in the theropod Allosaurus and the ornithopod Tenontosaurus. Because the line of dinosaurs that includes Allosaurus and Tyrannosaurus diverged from the line that led to Tenontosaurus very early in the evolution of dinosaurs, this suggests that dinosaurs in general produced medullary tissue. Medullary bone has been found in specimens of sub-adult size, which suggests that dinosaurs reached sexual maturity rather quickly for such large animals.

Ornithopod reproduction

Hadrosaur reproduction

In the Dinosaur Park Formation

In a 2001 review of hadrosaur eggshell and hatchling material from Alberta's Dinosaur Park Formation, Darren Tanke and M. K. Brett-Surman concluded that hadrosaurs nested in both the ancient upland and lowlands of the formation's depositional environment. 
The upland nesting grounds may have been preferred by the less common hadrosaurs, like Brachylophosaurus or Parasaurolophus. However, the authors were unable to determine what specific factors shaped nesting ground choice in the formation's hadrosaurs. They suggested that behavior, diet, soil condition, and competition between dinosaur species all potentially influenced where hadrosaurs nested.

Sub-centimeter fragments of pebbly-textured hadrosaur eggshell have been reported from the Dinosaur Park Formation. This eggshell is similar to the hadrosaur eggshell of Devil's Coulee in southern Alberta as well as that of the Two Medicine and Judith River Formations in Montana, United States. While present, dinosaur eggshell is very rare in the Dinosaur Park Formation and is only found in two different microfossil sites. These sites are distinguished by large numbers of pisidiid clams and other less common shelled invertebrates like unionid clams and snails. This association is not a coincidence as the invertebrate shells would have slowly dissolved and released enough basic calcium carbonate to protect the eggshells from naturally occurring acids that otherwise would have dissolved them and prevented fossilization.

In contrast with eggshell fossils, the remains of very young hadrosaurs are actually somewhat common. Tanke has observed that an experienced collector could actually discover multiple juvenile hadrosaur specimens in a single day. The most common remains of young hadrosaurs in the Dinosaur Park Formation are dentaries, bones from limbs and feet, as well as vertebral centra. The material showed little or none of the abrasion that would have resulted from transport, meaning the fossils were buried near their point of origin. Bonebeds 23, 28, 47, and 50 are productive sources of young hadrosaur remains in the formation, especially bonebed 50. The bones of juvenile hadrosaurs and fossil eggshell fragments are not known to have preserved in association with each other, despite both being present in the formation.

See also

Footnotes

References
 
 Paul, Gregory S. (2010). Princeton Field Guide to Dinosaurs. Princeton University Press. .
 
 
 Tanke, D.H. and Brett-Surman, M.K. 2001. Evidence of Hatchling and Nestling-Size Hadrosaurs (Reptilia:Ornithischia) from Dinosaur Provincial Park (Dinosaur Park Formation: Campanian), Alberta, Canada. pp. 206–218. In: Mesozoic Vertebrate Life—New Research Inspired by the Paleontology of Philip J. Currie. Edited by D.H. Tanke and K. Carpenter. Indiana University Press: Bloomington. xviii + 577 pp.

 
Dinosaur paleobiology